The capsize of the ferry Pearl occurred on Thursday 13 February 1896 in the Brisbane River, Queensland, Australia. Many people died.

Background 
The ferry was a temporary measure due to the loss of both of the bridges that crossed the river, the Victoria Bridge and the Albert Railway Bridge at Indooroopilly after the floods of 1893. Steamers were then commissioned to transfer traffic across the river between Brisbane’s Queen’s Wharf and Musgrave Wharf.

The ferry was described as such: The Pearl was a wooden screw-steamer of ten horse-power and forty-one tons register, gross. Her dimensions were: 58.7ft long, 15.1ft beam, and 5.1ft depth, and she was built in New South Wales in 1883. She had been engaged in the river trade, and between Brisbane and Redland Bay, and was formerly running between the city and Humpybong. The vessel was built with an upper and lower deck, and was licensed to carry about 120 passengers in the river.

Accident 
On the afternoon of the disaster, at around 5pm, Pearl was re-crossing the river, which was flowing more strongly than usual due to floodwaters. To avoid a collision with another ship, Normanby, the captain cut power but the ferry was pushed downriver into the anchor chain of Lucinda, a government steam yacht anchored mid-river.

The hull breached and the ferry quickly capsized, drowning those below deck and throwing those on deck into the water, resulting in the death of most of the 80-100 people believed to be on board.

Nearby small boats, including those from other ferries and one from Lucinda, raced to the site and rescued around 40 survivors, some of whom clung to the anchor chain, life buoys, or wreckage. Others retrieved bodies down river in the following weeks.

An inquest was later held into the accident with blame focusing on the captain, James Chard (who survived), who may have been drinking.

References

External links
 

Brisbane River
Disasters in Brisbane
1896 in Australia
Shipwrecks in rivers